The Greek Catholic Eparchy of Miskolc is an eparchy (Eastern Catholic diocese) of the Greek Catholic Church in Hungary (Latin Miskolcensis), a Metropolitan particular church sui juris which uses the Byzantine Rite in the Hungarian language.

It is a suffragan of the Hungarian Catholic Archeparchy of Hajdúdorog, a Metropolitanate sui juris and the Hungarian Catholics' only province, entirely in Hungary and depending on the Roman Congregation for the Oriental Churches.

Its cathedral episcopal see is Nagyboldogasszony püspöki székesegyház, in Miskolc, in Borsod-Abaúj-Zemplén (northeastern Hungary).

History 
 It was established on 4 June 1924 as Apostolic Exarchate of Miskolc, an Eastern Catholic missionary pre-diocesan jurisdiction (comparable to a Latin Apostolic Prefecture or here rather to an Apostolic Vicariate as all incumbents held titular sees).  It consisted of the 21 Rusyn parishes formerly in the diocese of Prešov that remained in Hungarian territory after Czechoslovakia was created. They were provided with a distinct identity because they used Slavonic in the liturgy. By the 1940s, however, they had all begun to use Hungarian.
 On 5 March 2011 it gained territory from the then Hungarian Catholic Eparchy of Hajdúdorog, now its Metropolitan.
 On 20 March 2015 it was promoted as Eparchy (Diocese) of Miskolc and became suffragan of the simultaneously elevated Metropolitan Archeparchy (Archdiocese) of Hajdúdorog, which also became the newly created Eparchy of Nyiregyháza's Metropolitan.

Episcopal Hierarchs 
Apostolic Exarchs of Miskolc 
 Antal Papp (1924.07.14 – 1945.12.24) (born Ukraine), Titular Archbishop of Cyzicus (1924.07.14 – 1945.12.24); previously Titular Bishop of Lyrba (1912.04.29 – 1912.06.02) & Coadjutor Eparch of Mukacheve of the Ruthenians (Ukraine) (1912.04.29 – 1912.06.02), succeeding as Eparch (Bishop) of Mukacheve of the Ruthenians (1912.06.02 – 1924.07.14)
 Miklós Dudás, Basilian Order of Saint Josaphat (O.S.B.M.) (1946.10.14 – 1972.07.15), while Eparch (Bishop) of Hajdúdorog of the Hungarians (Hungary) (1939.03.25 – 1972.07.15)
 Imre Timkó (1975.01.07 – 1988.03.30), while Eparch of Hajdúdorog of the Hungarians (Hungary) (1975.01.07 – 1988.03.30)
 Szilárd Keresztes (1988.06.30 – 2007.11.10), while Bishop of Hajdúdorog of the Hungarians (Hungary) (1988.06.30 – 2007.11.10); previously Titular Bishop of Chunavia (1975.01.07 – 1988.06.30) & Auxiliary Eparch of Hajdúdorog of the Hungarians (Hungary) (1975.01.07 – 1988.06.30); later Apostolic Administrator of Hajdúdorog of the Hungarians (2007.11.10 – 2008.05.02)
Apostolic Administrator Péter Fülöp Kocsis (2008.05.02 – 2011.03.05), while Eparch of Hajdúdorog of the Hungarians (Hungary) (2008.05.02 – 2015.03.20), later promoted its first Archeparch (Metropolitan of Hajdúdorog of the Hungarians) (2015.03.20 – ...), President of Council of the Hungarian Church (2015.03.20 – ...)
 Atanáz Orosz (2011.03.05 – 2015.03.20 see below), Titular Bishop of Panium (2011.03.05 – 2015.03.20)Suffragan Eparchs (Bishops) of Miskolc 
 Atanáz Orosz (see above 2015.03.20 – ...), also Apostolic Administrator of Nyíregyháza of the Hungarians (Hungary) (2015.03.20 – 2015.10.31).

Statistics and extent 
As per 2014, it pastorally served 51,100 Hungarian (Byzantine rite) Catholics in 62 parishes and 10 missions with 71 priests (diocesan) and 21 seminarians.

The eparchy covers three Hungarian comitat (counties) : Borsod-Abaúj-Zemplén, Heves and Nógrád, plus part of Hajdúnánás.

Since 2012, the then exarchate include 59 parishes (in Hungarian : parókia) grouped in six vicariates : Abod, Edelény, Irota, Kazincbarcika, Múcsony, Ózd, Rakaca, Rakacaszend, Sajószentpéter, Szuhakálló, Viszló, Baktakék, Csobád, Encs, Felsővadász, Gadna, Garadna, Homrogd, Kány, Mogyoróska, Pere, Selyeb, Szikszó, Abaújszántó, Baskó, Bekecs, Bodrogkeresztúr, Bodrogolaszi, Boldogkőváralja, Komlóska, Mezőzombor, Szerencs, Tokaj, Tolcsva, Miskolc-Avas, Miskolc (-Belváros), Miskolc-Diósgyőr, Miskolc-Görömböly, Miskolc-Szirma, Arnót, Berzék, Eger, Emőd, Felsőzsolca, Hejőkeresztúr, Sajópálfala, Sajópetri, Sajóvámos, Szirmabesenyő, Tiszaújváros, Alsóregmec, Dámóc, Filkeháza, Kenézlő, Mikóháza, Pácin, Rudabányácska, Sárospatak, Sárospatak-Végardó, Sátoraljaújhely, Vajdácska and Zemplénagárd.

See also 
 List of Catholic dioceses in Hungary

References

Sources and external links 
 GigaCatholic, with Google satellite photo - data for all sections

Eastern Catholic dioceses in Hungary
Eastern Catholicism in Hungary
2015 establishments in Hungary